Sawers may refer to:

Alexander Sawers, Scottish footballer
Bill Sawers (1871–1960), Scottish footballer
John Sawers (born 1955), British diplomat and civil servant
Louisa Sawers (born 1988), British canoeist
Rowan Sawers (born 1954), Australian rules football umpire
William Sawers (1844–1916), Scottish–Australian politician